The Hinterwaldkopf is a mountain, in the Southern Black Forest in Germany. It lies in the southeastern part of the catchment area of the Dreisam east of Freiburg im Breisgau between Kirchzarten and Hinterzarten. To the north it is bounded by the 
Höllental valley, to the south by the Zastler valley. Nearby settlements include Kirchzarten, Oberried (Breisgau), Falkensteig (part of Buchenbach) and Hinterzarten. 

The characteristic outline of the Hinterwaldkopf is a symbol of the Dreisam valley. Its open summit region offers views over the valley to the Kandel. A trail managed by the Black Forest  Club runs over the mountain.

References 

Mountains and hills of Baden-Württemberg
Mountains and hills of the Black Forest
One-thousanders of Germany